Joel Swisher (born October 28, 1943) is a former American football coach.  He served as the head football coach at Dakota State University (1973–1976), Augustana College in Sioux Falls, South Dakota (1977–1980), Adams State College (1982–1983), and Jamestown College (1992–1994), compiling a career college football record of 65–55–4.

Coaching career
Swicher was the 16th head football coach at Adams State College—now known as Adams State University—in Alamosa, Colorado, serving for two seasons, from 1982 to 1983, and compiling a record of 7–10–2

He was the head football coach at Jamestown College—now known as the University of Jamestown–in Jamestown, North Dakota for three seasons, from 1992 to 1994, tallying a mark of 15–12.

Head coaching record

References

1943 births
Living people
Adams State Grizzlies football coaches
Augustana (South Dakota) Vikings football coaches
Dakota State Trojans football coaches
Doane Tigers football coaches
Eastern Illinois Panthers football coaches
Jamestown Jimmies football coaches
New Mexico Lobos football coaches
Northern State Wolves football players
South Dakota State Jackrabbits football coaches
Utah Utes football coaches
Western Michigan Broncos football coaches
College track and field coaches in the United States
High school football coaches in Minnesota
Junior college football coaches in the United States
South Dakota State University alumni
People from Aberdeen, South Dakota
Coaches of American football from South Dakota
Players of American football from South Dakota